Lucien Bonaparte Chase (December 5, 1817 – December 4, 1864) was an American politician and a member of the United States House of Representatives for Tennessee's 9th congressional district.

Biography
Chase was born in Derby Line, Vermont on December 5, 1817, the son of Jacob and Hannah W. Chase.

Career
Chase moved to Dover, Tennessee around 1838 and taught school. He studied law, was admitted to the bar, and began his practice in Charlotte, Tennessee in Dickson County. He moved to Clarksville, Tennessee and resumed the practice of law.

Elected as a member of the Democratic Party to the Twenty-ninth and Thirtieth Congresses, Chase served from March 4, 1845 to March 3, 1849.  He declined to be a candidate for re-election in 1848, and he moved to New York City in 1849. He again resumed the practice of law.

Death
Chase died in Derby Line, Vermont on December 4, 1864 (age 46 years, 365 days). He is interred in Green-Wood Cemetery in Brooklyn, New York.

Bibliography
 History of the Polk administration (1850)
 English serfdom and American slavery or, Ourselves--As others see us (1854)

References

External links

The Political Graveyard

1817 births
1864 deaths
Burials at Green-Wood Cemetery
People from Derby, Vermont
Tennessee lawyers
Democratic Party members of the United States House of Representatives from Tennessee
19th-century American politicians
People from Dover, Tennessee
People from Dickson County, Tennessee
People from Clarksville, Tennessee
19th-century American lawyers